Joe Piggott (born 23 June 1998) is an English professional footballer who plays as a forward for Northern Premier League Premier Division side Radcliffe. He made his senior debut in 2017 for Dundee United and has also played for Warrington Town and Wigan Athletic. He has also spent time on loan with Morecambe, Altrincham and Stockport County.

Club career
Born in Nantwich, Piggott had spells with Rochdale and the club he supported, Everton, before joining Scottish Championship club Dundee United in September 2017. He went onto make his first-team debut for United in a Scottish Challenge Cup tie against Alloa Athletic, playing for 71 minutes in a 3–1 victory.

After one further first team appearance for Dundee United, Piggott was released and returned to England, joining Northern Premier League club Warrington Town in January 2018. He scored an equalising goal on his debut in an FA Trophy defeat to National League South club Wealdstone. Four days later, he scored two goals against Matlock Town. Piggott's form at Warrington led to a transfer to EFL Championship club Wigan Athletic in August 2018.

After playing for Wigan's under-23 side in pre-season, Piggott was loaned to League Two club Morecambe until January 2019 and went onto make his debut during a 3–2 defeat to Bury. Three days later, he scored his first goal for the club during an EFL Trophy defeat to Carlisle United, giving Morecambe a 2–1 lead in the 24th minute.

Piggott first joined National League North club Altrincham on loan in January 2019, scoring his first goals for the club in a 6–0 win over Curzon Ashton. In September 2019 he went on loan again, joining Stockport County in the National League, before returning to Wigan later that month. On 22 January 2021, Piggott left Wigan Athletic by mutual consent.

On 30 January 2021, Piggott rejoined Altrincham, now in the National League, on a contract until the end of the 2021-22 season.

Piggott joined National League North side AFC Fylde on a short-term deal in August 2021, a deal that was renewed into a one-year deal in October with the club holding an option for another year. In October 2022, Piggott joined Radcliffe.

Career statistics

References

External links

1998 births
Living people
English footballers
People from Nantwich
Association football forwards
Everton F.C. players
Rochdale A.F.C. players
Dundee United F.C. players
Warrington Town F.C. players
Wigan Athletic F.C. players
Morecambe F.C. players
Altrincham F.C. players
Stockport County F.C. players
AFC Fylde players
Radcliffe F.C. players
Northern Premier League players
English Football League players
National League (English football) players